Robert Pollock (born 1960) is a New Zealand actor.

Life
Pollock graduated from Toi Whakaari: New Zealand Drama School in 1986 with a Diploma in Acting.

Filmography

Film
 Beyond Gravity (1988)
 Once Were Warriors (1994) – Policeman
 The Lord of the Rings: The Return of the King – Orc Sergeant (Extended Edition only)

Television
 Shark in the Park (1990) – Dingo
 Shortland Street (1992/1999-2000) – Dennis Cracknell/Rex Yates
 Riding High (1995)
 Hercules: The Legendary Journeys (1995) – Minos
 City Life (1996/1997) – Marcus
 Love Mussel (2001) – Roger Davies
 Ike: Countdown to D-Day (2004) – 101st Airborne sergeant
 Power Rangers S.P.D (2005) – Vine Monster
 Orange Roughies (2006) – Roger Steele

References

External links
 
 Robert Pollock on ConArtists.co.nz
 31 May 2007, "New Zealand actors sue New Line", Variety

New Zealand male film actors
New Zealand male television actors
1960 births
Living people

Toi Whakaari alumni